Hong Kong Design Institute (HKDI) is a design school in Tiu Keng Leng, Tseung Kwan O, Hong Kong. It was founded by the Vocational Training Council in 2007 and moved into a purpose-built campus in 2010. The school offers higher diplomas, academic degrees, and continuing education programmes in various design disciplines.

History 
The Hong Kong Design Institute was envisioned to centralise existing design programmes offered at various other Hong Kong Institute of Vocational Education campuses in Tiu Keng Leng, Sha Tin, Kwai Chung, Kwun Tong, and Tsing Yi.

In April 2006, the VTC opened an international architecture competition to design a new campus able to accommodate 4,000 students. The competition was judged by a panel of noted architects including Richard Meier and Rocco Yim. The winning design, which beat out 162 other submissions, was produced by the French architecture firm Coldefy & Associés.

Administration 
Academic oversight of the Hong Kong Design Institute is provided by the Academic Director (Design Discipline) of the Vocational Training Council who is concurrently the campus Principal. The Hong Kong Design Institute and Institute of Vocational Education (Lee Wai Lee) combined campus at Tiu Keng Leng is managed by the campus Principal and Vice-Principals. The Design programmes are offered mainly at the Tiu Keung Leng site with some programmes located at the IVE (Kwun Tong) and IVE (Morison Hill) campuses.

Academic departments and programmes

Department of Architecture, Interior and Product Design 
 Higher Diploma in Architecture, Interior and Landscape Design (Subject Group)
 Architectural Design 
 Interior Design
 Landscape Architecture

 Design for Event, Exhibition and Performance (Subject Group)
 Event and Exhibition Design
 Stage and Set Design
 Product, Furniture and Jewellery Design (Subject Group)
 Product Design
 Furniture and Lifestyle Product Design 
 Jewellery Design and Technology

Department of Communication Design 
 Advertising Design
 Illustration
 Visual Arts and Culture
 Visual Communication

Department of Digital Media 
 Animation and Visual Effects
 Creative Media
 Digital Music and Media
 Film, Television and Photography
 Transmedia

Department of Fashion and Image Design 
 Costume Design for Performance
 Fashion Branding and Buying
 Fashion Design
 Fashion Design Menswear
 Fashion Image Design
 Fashion Media Design

Knowledge Centres 
 Centre for Communication Design
 Centre of Innovative Material and Technology
 Centre of Design Services and Solutions
 DESIS Lab (Design for Social Innovation and Sustainability)
 Fashion Archive
 Media Lab

Campus 
The HKDI campus, located in Tiu Keng Leng in Tseung Kwan O New Town, opened in the fall of 2010. The building comprises a massive rectangular volume suspended seven storeys above street level on four towers supported by a steel lattice exoskeleton. The podium houses four auditoriums and lecture theaters, a cafe, and gallery and exhibition space. Sports facilities include an indoor games hall, outdoor basketball courts, and a swimming pool.

The HKDI is located beside the new Institute of Vocational Education (IVE) Lee Wai Lee campus, which relocated from Kowloon Tong before the 2010-11 school year. The two buildings are linked together by footbridges.

The campus is across the street from Tiu Keng Leng station (Exit A2), which serves both the Tseung Kwan O line and Kwun Tong line of the MTR.

References

External links 

 /
 HKDI Gallery

Art schools in Hong Kong
Universities and colleges in Hong Kong
Design schools
Tseung Kwan O